The Canton of Mehun-sur-Yèvre is a canton situated in the Cher département and in the Centre-Val de Loire region of France.

Geography
A farming area in the valley of the river Yèvre, in the southeastern part of the arrondissement of Vierzon, centred on the town of Mehun-sur-Yèvre. The altitude varies from 97m at Foëcy to 162m at Berry-Bouy, with an average altitude of 125m.

Composition
At the French canton reorganisation which came into effect in March 2015, the canton was expanded from 5 to 15 communes:
 
Allouis
Berry-Bouy
Brinay
Cerbois
Chéry
Foëcy
Lazenay
Limeux
Lury-sur-Arnon
Massay
Mehun-sur-Yèvre
Méreau
Preuilly
Quincy
Sainte-Thorette

Population

See also
 Arrondissements of the Cher department
 Cantons of the Cher department
 Communes of the Cher department

References

Mehun-sur-Yevre